North Rocky River Prong is a  long 3rd order tributary to the Rocky River that begins in Liberty, North Carolina in Randolph County and flows to Chatham County.

Course
North Rocky River Prong rises on the northside of Liberty, North Carolina, and then flows southeast into Alamance County and south into Chatham County.  North Prong Rocky River joins the Rocky River about 3 miles east of Staley, North Carolina.

Watershed
North Rocky River Prong drains  of area, receives about 47.3 in/year of precipitation, has a wetness index of 437.93 and is about 34% forested.

References

Rivers of North Carolina
Rivers of Alamance County, North Carolina
Rivers of Chatham County, North Carolina
Rivers of Randolph County, North Carolina